You're Hired (Traditional Chinese: 絕代商驕) is a TVB modern comedy series released in 2009.

Synopsis
A previous successful entrepreneur, Mak Tai Song (Dayo Wong) searches for his mentor's wife, Sheh Mo Lin (Theresa Lee) and helps pay off her debt because he feels guilty for his mentor's death. On the other hand, Tong Kat (Benz Hung) pleads Mak Tai Song to mentor him, hoping to accomplish something for his father's billionaire company. Song ends up mentoring Tong Kat on a part-time basis and take shelves of good wine as payments. Song then gets chase down on making payments for She Mo Lin's debt by Lam Miu Miu (Charmaine Sheh), the debt collection agent of Sheh Mo Lin. The conflicting personalities of Lam Miu Miu, a wild spender and Mak Tai Song, a free-loader, causes many laughing moments of the drama and in the end, both fall in love with each other. When Lam Miu Miu thinks things are finally turning out the way she wants, she gets confused by Song's sudden changes and evil-tactics against Ngon Jo Lin (Michael Tse), Song's half-brother. Perhaps Song's long-lost childhood will change him entirely and make him more distant to Lam Miu Miu...

Cast

On Family

Ho Family

Lam Family

Tong Family

Other cast

Awards and nominations
TVB Anniversary Awards (2009)
 Best Drama
 Best Actor (Dayo Wong)
 My Favourite Male Character (Dayo Wong)
 My Favourite Female Character (Charmaine Sheh)
 Most Improved Actress (Queenie Chu)
 Most Improved Actress (Koni Lui)

Viewership ratings

References

External links
TVB.com You're Hired - Official Website 

TVB dramas
2009 Hong Kong television series debuts
2009 Hong Kong television series endings